Baunt (Baunt nuur) is the name of a body of fresh water in the Bauntovsky District, Buryatia, Russia. 

The village of Kurort Baunt, where there are some hot springs, is located on the southwestern shore of the lake, at the foot of Mt Bolshoy Khapton, near the confluence of the Upper Tsipa, and the village of Baunt is on the northeastern shore. At a headland named Cape Tryokhstanka there are ancient petroglyphs. The lake is a protected area since 1988. Its environment provides a habitat for a number of fish and bird species, as well as the crustacean Asellus aquaticus.

Geography
The lake has a roughly triangular shape. It stretches in a southwest-northeast direction parallel to the main ridge of the Southern Muya Range to the north and the Baunt Basin, with the Maly Khapton and Babanty Range, two ranges of the Vitim Plateau, to the south. The Ikat Range rises to the west and the Kapylyushi lakes lie to the southwest. The Upper Tsipa enters the lake at the SW shore through two arms. The Tsipikan flows from the east into the lake and further to the east lies lake Busani. The lower Tsipa river flows out of the lake from the northeast. 

On the other hand, the shores to the southwest and east are low and marshy, with many small lakes and bogs. The lake freezes between late October or early November to May or early June.

See also
List of lakes of Russia

References

External links

Geography of tourism in the Republic of Buryatia
Baunt
South Siberian Mountains